The Lelantine Plain (Ancient Greek: Ληλάντου πεδίον or Λήλαντον πεδίον; Modern Greek: Ληλάντιο πεδίο) is a fertile plain on the Greek island of Euboea, between Chalcis and Eretria. In the late eighth century BC a dispute over its possession was the cause of the Lelantine War. In the Middle Ages it was known as Lilanto; a Venetian document from 1439 describes a crisis caused by the powerful taking more than their share of the irrigation water:
and so many plots have remained unirrigated, and if things continue like this, the place Lilanto, which is the life of this island, will turn into a desolation - a place which provides more utility to the Signoria than any other, through being the eye and garden of Euboea.

It is presumably named for the Lelantos River (Ancient Greek: Λήλαντος), now the Lilas (Modern Greek: Λίλας), which runs through it, though ancient scholiasts derived it from the name of an otherwise unknown king Lelantos.

References

Plains of Greece
Ancient Greek geography
Landforms of Euboea (regional unit)